Armenian Sport in the Ottoman Empire refers to Armenian Sport in the Ottoman Empire.

The history of the development of Armenian sport and gymnastics in the Ottoman Empire began by the end of 19th century, when the first athletic clubs and societies were established. Under the rule of the Sultan, being engaged in sports or athletics was strictly forbidden and those who broke this law were punished.

First Clubs
After the coup d'état of Young Turks in 1908, the first Armenian athletic clubs and football teams were formed in Constantinople and Smyrna.

In 1911–1914, four Armenian Olympic Games were held in Constantinople.

From 1911 to 1914, Shavarsh Chrisyan published the Marmnamarz sports magazine. It was the first sports periodical in the Ottoman Empire . Its name Marmnamarz meant sport in Armenian.

For the first time in the history of Turkish Olympic Games, two Armenian sportsmen--Vahram Papazyan and Mkrtich Mkryan represented Ottoman Turkey in the Fifth International Olympic Games in Stockholm in 1912. In 1915–1920, many Armenian sportsmen became victims of the genocide and most of the Armenian sports clubs were shut down.

Before The Great War
On the eve of World War I there were about 40 Armenian athletic clubs in Constantinople. Armenian football teams took part in team and international tournaments of several leagues in the capital. The most famous football teams were “Balta Liman”, “Araks” and “Torq”. The most famous team of Smyrna was “Hay Vorsordats Club” (“The Armenian Hunters’ club"). Armenian sport clubs were established also in Smyrna (İzmir), Nicomedia (İzmit), Karin (Erzurum), Marzvan (Merzifon), Samson, Adana, Van, Caesarea (Kayseri), Dortyol (Dörtyol), Trapizon (Trabzon), Konya etc.

In 1911-1914 the Pan-Armenian Olympic Games were organized with the participation of tens of Armenian sport and athletic clubs and societies. During the Games records were held and the winners were awarded with silver medals. In 1914, Armenia also held the first “Cilician Olympic Games”.

Many  Armenian sportsmen fell victims to the Armenian genocide. Among them was Shavarsh Krissian, the editor of Marmnamarz, and after it the publication of the magazine was stopped.

References

External links 
THE ARMENIAN GENOCIDE MUSEUM-INSTITUTE - Armenian Sport in the Ottoman Empire
Panorama.am - The role of Armenian Sport in Ottoman Empire
PUBLIC RADIO OF ARMENIA - Display of the history of Armenian sport in Turkey to be held at the Genocide Institute
THE ARMENIAN GENOCIDE MUSEUM-INSTITUTE - An illustrated book published by AGMI - “Armenian Sport and Gymnastics in the Ottoman Empire”

Sport in Armenia
Ottoman period in Armenia
Sport in the Ottoman Empire